Carlos Uriel Antuna Romero (born 21 August 1997) is a Mexican professional footballer who plays as a winger for Liga MX club Cruz Azul and the Mexico national team.

Club career

Early career
In 2012, Antuna joined the Santos Laguna youth academy, successfully going through the U-15, U-17 and U-20 teams.

In 2017, first-team manager José Manuel de la Torre promoted Antuna. On 5 March, Antuna made his professional debut in the Liga MX entering as a substitute in a 2–1 loss to Pumas UNAM.

FC Groningen
On 12 July 2017, English club Manchester City, via City Football Group, announced they had signed Antuna on a four-year contract. On 9 August, he joined Eredivisie club FC Groningen on a two-year loan deal.

On 10 September, Antuna made his league debut against VVV-Venlo; he entered the match as a substitute in a 1–1 draw.

LA Galaxy
On 29 January 2019, Antuna joined MLS side LA Galaxy on loan for their 2019 season. He scored his first goal for the team in their 2–1 victory over Real Salt Lake on 28 April. In October, he extended his contract with Manchester City, keeping him through 2022. At the end of his time with LA Galaxy, he made 31 league appearances with 6 goals and 5 assists; he also received interest from Portuguese club Benfica.

Guadalajara
On 28 November 2019, Antuna joined Liga MX side Guadalajara. On 11 January 2020, he would make his debut with Guadalajara, coming on as a substitute for Isaác Brizuela in a 2–0 victory over Juárez. On 5 September, Antuna scored his first goal with Chivas against Tigres UANL in a 3–1 victory.

International career

Youth
Antuna was called up to the under-20 team camp in preparations for the 2017 CONCACAF U-20 Championship. He was subsequently called up for the tournament. During a classification stage match against El Salvador he would score a hat-trick, with Mexico winning the match 6–1. He was included in the best XI of the tournament. Antuna was called up for the 2017 FIFA U-20 World Cup. He would appear in all five matches until they were eliminated by England in the quarter-finals.

Antuna was included in the final roster that participated at the 2018 Toulon Tournament. He would appear in all five matches as Mexico went on to face England in the final, losing 2–1.

Antuna participated at the 2020 CONCACAF Olympic Qualifying Championship, scoring three goals in five appearances, where Mexico won the competition. He was subsequently included in the tournament's Best XI. He was subsequently called up to participate in the 2020 Summer Olympics. Antuna won the bronze medal with the Olympic team.

Senior
On 3 November 2017, Juan Carlos Osorio named Antuna to the senior national team for the friendly matches against Belgium and Poland on 10 and 13 November but did not appear in either match.

In May 2019, Antuna was included in Gerardo Martino's preliminary list for the CONCACAF Gold Cup. He made his debut on 5 June in a friendly against Venezuela, appearing as a 68th minute substitute for Roberto Alvarado. After originally being left out of the definite list for the Gold Cup, he was included after Jorge Sánchez picked up an injury in a friendly match against Ecuador. In Mexico's opening match against Cuba, Antuna scored a hat-trick and provided an assist in the team's 7–0 rout; his first goal at the 2nd minute of the match is the fastest goal scored by Mexico in a Gold Cup tournament. He appeared in every match as Mexico would go on to win the tournament.

On 19 November, in Mexico's final Nations League group stage match against Bermuda, Antuna scored the winning goal in injury time to secure a 2–1 win, maintaining Mexico's perfect group-stage record.

In October 2022, Antuna was named in Mexico's preliminary 31-man squad for the 2022 FIFA World Cup, and in November, he was ultimately included in the final 26-man roster.

Style of play
Antuna is an agile player with sheer acceleration and speed who can dribble past opponents, with ESPN describing his work rate as "intriguing" yet "unrefined." Described as a player that likes to hold on to the ball and cross, he is fouled on often.

During a Guardianes 2020 quarter-finals match against Club América, his speed throughout the encounter was recorded as one of the fastest footballers in the world, second to Kylian Mbappe.

Career statistics

Club

International

Scores and results list Mexico's goal tally first, score column indicates score after each Antuna goal.

Honours
Cruz Azul
Supercopa de la Liga MX: 2022Mexico U23CONCACAF Olympic Qualifying Championship: 2020
Olympic Bronze Medal: 2020MexicoCONCACAF Gold Cup: 2019Individual'''
CONCACAF U-20 Championship Best XI: 2017
Liga MX Best XI: Guardianes 2020
CONCACAF Olympic Qualifying Championship Best XI: 2020
Liga MX All-Star: 2022

Notes

References

External links
 
 
 
 
 
 
  Carlos Antuna at Concacaf Mexico U-20 
 Carlos Antuna at MCFC Watch
 Carlos Antuna at Informador 

1997 births
Living people
People from Gómez Palacio, Durango
Footballers from Durango
Mexican footballers
Association football wingers
Santos Laguna footballers
Manchester City F.C. players
FC Groningen players
LA Galaxy players
C.D. Guadalajara footballers
Liga MX players
Liga Premier de México players
Eredivisie players
Derde Divisie players
Major League Soccer players
2019 CONCACAF Gold Cup players
CONCACAF Gold Cup-winning players
Mexico under-20 international footballers
Mexico international footballers
Footballers at the 2020 Summer Olympics
Olympic footballers of Mexico
Olympic medalists in football
Olympic bronze medalists for Mexico
Medalists at the 2020 Summer Olympics
Mexican expatriate footballers
Mexican expatriate sportspeople in the Netherlands
Mexican expatriate sportspeople in the United States
Expatriate footballers in the Netherlands
Expatriate soccer players in the United States
2022 FIFA World Cup players